Seddington is a hamlet located in the Central Bedfordshire district of Bedfordshire, England.

Originally part of the historic Wixamtree hundred, Seddington was then part of the Northill civil parish until 1933 when it was transferred to Sandy. Today, the settlement straddles the A1 road, south of Beeston.

References

Hamlets in Bedfordshire
Central Bedfordshire District